The presence of the Catholic Church in the Chinese province of Sichuan (formerly romanized as Szechwan or Szechuan in English; and Sutchuen, Setchuen, Sétchouan in French) dates back to 1640, when two missionaries, Lodovico Buglio and Gabriel de Magalhães, through Jesuit China missions, entered the province and spent much of the 1640s doing evangelism.

The Yongzheng edict of 1724 proscribed Christianity in the Qing empire and declared foreign missionaries . Catholics in Sichuan learned how to make do without ordained priests. When the Qing became ever more possessed by the idea that Catholics belonged to a "heretical" organization (as contrasted with the "orthodoxy" of Confucianism) which might threaten the empire's order and rule, district magistrates found it convenient to manipulate non-Catholic communities against the Catholics, leading to discrimination as well as social and political pressure against Catholic families. As a consequence, significant numbers of Catholics withdrew into the remote mountains and hinterlands of western Sichuan, becoming "hidden Christians" whom were mistaken for Buddhists by European missionaries after the lifting of missionary controls in 1858.

Nevertheless, by 1870, the Sichuanese Church had 80,000 baptized members, which was the largest number of Catholics in the entire country. By 1911, the number increased to 118,724 members. Throughout its ecclesiastical history, Sichuan was one of the hotbeds of anti-missionary riots in China.

The primate of the province is the Archbishop of Chongqing (Chungking), with his seat at St. Joseph's Cathedral. The post has been vacant since the last Archbishop  died in 2001.

While works on the Catholic missions in the capitals of the Chinese empires are abundant (Chang'an, Khanbaliq/Karakorum, Nanjing, Beijing), few Catholic phenomena have been analysed in the Sichuan Province.

History

Early period 

Thirty people received baptism the following year, who were the first Catholics in Sichuan. There was a certain Peter (Petrus) among them, according to An Account of the Entry of the Catholic Religion into Sichuan, he was a descendant of an unidentified prince of Shu and quite active in the congregation. After the Portuguese Jesuit Gabriel de Magalhães joined the mission in August 1642, work began at once in Chengtu, Paoning and Chungking.

They found a considerable number of converts in Paoning, Candida then invited the priest Claudius Motel to serve the congregation. Several churches were built in Chengtu, Paoning and Chungking under Motel's supervision, and he baptized 600 people in one year.

18th century 

The Apostolic Vicariate of Szechwan was established on 15 October 1696, with its headquarters in Chengtu. Its first apostolic vicar was Artus de Lionne, a French missionary of the Paris Foreign Missions Society (MEP). De Lionne managed to recruit four priests for his vicariate. In 1700, he entrusted the city of Chengtu and the western part of Sichuan to the MEP priests Jean Basset and Jean-François Martin de La Baluère. De Lionne entrusted them with Chungking and the eastern part of Sichuan. Two different missionary congregations thus found themselves assuming responsibilities in the same province. Though very few in number and facing considerable hardship, the priests of these two societies competed for territory.

For Basset, there was only one remedy: translating the Bible and authorizing a liturgy in Chinese. "It was", he pointed out, "the practice of the apostles and it is the only way to familiarize the Chinese people with the Christian message". Basset set to work on the translation with the assistance of a local convert, Johan Su. Together they produced a New Testament translation in six large volumes which is now known as the Basset–Su Chinese New Testament.

In 1723, the arrival of the Los in Kiangtsin made the town an important Catholic center in eastern Sichuan. The Lo family built a church and a clergy house with donations from the local faithful. During a period of ten years from 1736 to 1746, Giovanni Battista Kou (Joannes-Baptista Kou; 1701–1763) had resided in the clergy house while doing missionary work. The faithful from surrounding cities used to gather at the Kiangtsin church to sing the mass and receive the sacraments administered by Father Kou. The sheng and xiao were used during major Catholic feasts.

During this period, an emerging phenomenon of consecrated virgins came into existence in Sichuan. One of the earliest such virgins was Agnes Yang, a woman from the Mingshan District in western Sichuan. Her baptism was confirmed by an MEP missionary Joachim-Enjobert de Martiliat, author of the first detailed Rules for Consecrated Virgins (1744). The latter visited Agnes again in 1733 when she was over 50 and found that she had remained faithful and chaste. These unmarried Catholic women served as baptizers and female catechists for the evangelization among women. The role they played was important in the growth of the Church in Sichuan, because of the segregation of the sexes in China. The most committed promoter of this practice was Jean-Martin Moye, provicar of Eastern Szechwan and Kweichow since 1773, who founded the Congregation of the Sisters of Providence in Lorraine before entering the mission field of Sichuan.

In 1753, the MEP took over responsibility for Catholic mission in Sichuan. In 1756, a young priest ordained in Tours just three years ago, arrived in Sichuan, taking charge as provicar of the five or six thousand Catholics dispersed in the province. After three years of pastoral visits, he was arrested and tortured, spent a few months in prison in Chungking. In 1767 he was appointed Titular Bishop of Agathopolis and Apostolic Vicar of Szechwan. His episcopal consecration on 10 September 1769 took place in Xi'an, the capital of Shaanxi Province, where he had to flee during a persecution. Having sold his house in Chengtu in 1764, Pottier retired with seven students to a cottage in Fenghuangshan (Phoenix Mountain), 7 kilometers west of Chengtu. His poor school reminded him of the stable in Bethlehem, he called it the "Nativity Seminary". In 1770, his school was denounced to the authorities, and the cottage was destroyed. A few years later, Bishop Pottier resumed the work of training future priests by founding in 1780 a seminary at Long-ki in the Sichuan-Yunnan border region. From 1780 to 1814, forty priests left this seminary and moved to Lo-lang-keou in southern Sichuan shortly after its opening.

In 1783, Pottier chose Jean-Didier de Saint-Martin as coadjutor and ordained him bishop at Chengtu on 13 June 1784. Saint-Martin was imprisoned and then expelled from China the following year, but he managed to return to his post in 1792, the year of Pottier's death. He ensured his own succession by taking Louis Gabriel Taurin Dufresse as coadjutor, whom he ordained Bishop of Tabraca in 1800. This new bishop already had twenty years of experience in Sichuan, where he arrived in 1776. His ministry was interrupted by the persecution of 1784. Dufresse was imprisoned, brought to Peking and then exiled to Portuguese Macau and the Spanish Philippines, he secretly returned to Chengtu in 1789 and was put in charge of the Eastern Szechwan and Kweichow missions. On the death of Saint-Martin in 1801, he took charge of the entire province. Despite the insecurity and multiple setbacks, the Church in Sichuan was then relatively prosperous. In 1756 there were 4,000 Catholics and two local priests in the province. In 1802, the number increased tenfold with 40,000 Catholics and 16 local priests. The pastoral experience accumulated during the eighteenth century made it possible to establish a general directory of the conditions of Christian life and the ministry of the sacraments.

19th century 

In 1803, Bishop Dufresse convened the first synod in China near Chungkingchow, 40 kilometers west of Chengtu. The decisions refer primarily to the pastoral care of the sacraments. Chapter 10 deals with the ministry of the priests, recommending fervor in the spiritual life and discretion in temporal things. The provisions of the Synod of Sichuan were to guide the apostolate in this province until the Plenary Council of Shanghai in 1924.

In 1815, Dufresse was arrested and beheaded, along with another bishop and nine priests in Chengtu on 14 September 1815. His head was tied to a post and his body was exposed for three days as a warning to others. He was canonized saint by Pope John Paul II on 1 October 2000.

Many of its missionaries were well educated in the natural sciences (botany, zoology, geology) and sought to come into contact with scientific establishments of Paris.

Today the Church of the Annunciation is well-remembered thanks to Armand David, a Lazarist missionary as well as a zoologist and a botanist, the "discoverer" of the pandas, who in 1869 arrived at Muping in a sedan chair.

At Bailu, Pengzhou, construction of the Annunciation Seminary was started in 1895 by Bishop Marie-Julien Dunand, successor to Bishop Pinchon who died in 1891. The seminary was designed by two French missionaries, Alexandre Perrodin and Léon Rousseau. The construction lasted 13 years, after its completion in 1908, it became an important institute for the training of priests in the province at that time.

That same year (1895) was marked by a serious outbreak of anti-foreign agitation began in the capital Chengtu, and thence spread throughout the province. In the capital, the property of the Roman Catholics and that of three Protestant missions was destroyed; and all missionaries of all missions, Catholic and Protestant alike, were thankful to escape with their lives.

In 1897, Fr. Adolphe Roulland was appointed vicar by Paris Foreign Missions Society at Yeou-yang, in the city of Chungking. Five years later (1902), he was appointed parish priest of Ma-pao-tchang (now known as ) in the same city, where he stayed for seven years. Fr. Roulland was a spiritual brother of Saint Thérèse of Lisieux. He gifted the  the book by Léonide Guiot,  ('The Su-Tchuen Mission in the 18th Century: Life and Apostolate of Bishop Pottier', 1892), which had a great influence on Thérèse. In her letter to Roulland dated 30 July 1896, Thérèse expressed her hope for a visit to Sichuan: "I have attached the map of Su-Tchuen on the wall where I work, [...] I will ask Jesus' permission to go to visit you at Su-Tchuen, and we shall continue our apostolate together." Today, in addition to keeping one of Thérèse's letters to Fr. Roulland, the Church of Janua Coeli at Shima also preserves one of her relics.

20th century 

In 1905, four French missionaries were killed in the Batang uprising, including Jean-André Soulié, who worked in the Apostolic Vicariate of Tibet. He was captured, tortured and shot close to Yaregong, by lamas during the revolt. Nine years later (1914), Théodore Monbeig, another French missionary working in the Sichuan-Tibetan border region, was killed by lamas near Litang, not long after helping revive the Christian community at Batang.

This work is allegedly based on Gabriel de Magalhães's .

By the end of 1921, there were 143,747 Catholic Christians in Sichuan. These worshipped in 826 chapels and churches scattered throughout the province which was divided into four bishoprics with episcopal residences at Chengtu, Chungking, Suifu and Ningyüanfu. Almost 8,000 adults were baptized into the Roman Catholic Church during 1918. In addition to regular evangelistic activities, the Church maintained nearly 400 parish schools of primary grade with over 7,500 students. There were three colleges in the province, two in Chungking and one in Chengtu; ten seminaries, and five schools for girls. Roman Catholic missions also reported five hospitals and seven dispensaries.

In February 1928, Segundo Miguel Rodríguez, José Morán Pan and Segundo Velasco Arina sailed for China. Initially, they were put in charge of the seminary of the Congregation of the Disciples of the Lord in the Diocese of Xuanhua, Hebei Province. Subsequently, they were transferred to Sichuan as the first band of Spanish Redemptorist missionaries to take up work in that province. They were active in the Apostolic Vicariate of Chengtu and the Apostolic Vicariate of Ningyüanfu, they also had a house and chapel built in Chengtu. The last Spanish Redemptorists were expelled from China by the communist government in 1952.

In 1930, a Spanish Franciscan friar and artist  arrived in Mosimien, a small town located in Garzê, one of the three Tibetan regions of Western Sichuan. There were dormitories for leper patients, a pharmacy and an infirmary. The installation of the first lepers was not easy, given their ignorance and the situation of marginalization and social aversion in which they lived. Nevertheless, by 1935, the missionaries already had a hundred patients.

In May 1935, a communist army column led by Mao Tse Tung (Mao Zedong) was fleeing Chiang Kai-shek's regular army to northwest China through the Mosimien area. According to the Valencian Franciscan friar José Miguel Barrachina Lapiedra, author of the book , and a report published in Malaya Catholic Leader, the official newspaper of the Roman Catholic Archdiocese of Singapore: "The communist soldiers entered the leper colony, they looted the residence and arrested the friars and sisters. Many of the lepers tried to defend the missionaries, but they were shot by the soldiers. The Franciscans were then brought before Mao Tse Tung, who interrogated them, imprisoned two of them, Pascual Nadal Oltra and an Italian friar Epifanio Pegoraro, and released the rest. There were more than 30,000 Reds in the band, including a large number of women. Before their departure, the soldiers ransacked the village, carrying away everything movable and edible, left the people of the district without means of subsistence. Days later, on 4 December 1935, the army reached , Tsanlha, where the two Franciscans were beheaded with a sword."

In her letter to the poet Raymond Cortat, dated 17 January 1937, Marie-Rosine Sahler, a member of the Franciscan Missionaries of Mary, recounts in detail her journey, her arrival in China and her life in the Mosimien leper colony, a testimony about the political hardship: "In 1935, the leper colony was savagely attacked by communist army and the mission community had to flee to the mountains and stay there for eight days. Upon her return, she found the leper colony ransacked and all supplies looted. Nevertheless, the community managed to recover and welcome back the sick, who in 1937 were 148 people."

Current situation 
After the communist takeover of China in 1949, Catholicism in China, like all religions, has since been permitted to operate only under the supervision of the State Administration for Religious Affairs. All legal worship has to be conducted in government-approved churches belonging to the Catholic Patriotic Association, which does not accept the primacy of the Roman pontiff. Some missionaries were arrested and sent to "thought reform centers" in which they underwent disturbing re-education process in a vindictive prison setting.

During the Land Reform Movement in the early 1950s, several Legion of Mary (LOM) organizations in Pengzhou were banned and persecuted, since the communist regime termed the LOM a "counter-revolutionary force".

Following the devastation of dozens of churches by the 2008 Sichuan earthquake, Audrey Donnithorne set up a fund for the reconstruction of churches, schools and nurseries in that province where she had been born in 1922. Audrey was the daughter of Vyvyan Donnithorne, an English Anglican missionary stationed at the Gospel Church of Hanchow in northern Sichuan during the 1930s. She converted to Roman Catholicism during her young adulthood. She was crucial in the reconciliation of a "patriotic" bishop in Sichuan with the Holy See, leading to the establishment of unity between the "underground" and "patriotic" churches in that province. She was expelled from Mainland China in 1997 due to her activities for the Church.

In 2011, after trying to reclaim two former church properties in Mosimien that were confiscated by authorities in the 1950s, Sister Xie Yuming and Father Huang Yusong were attacked by a group of unknown assailants on 3 September. The nun was severely beaten while the priest suffered minor injuries. The properties, a Latin school demolished by the authorities, and a boys' school occupied by Mosimien government officials by the time, were formerly owned by the Diocese of Kangding.

On 29 June 2022, a celebration of the anniversary of the founding of the Chinese Communist Party was held at the Cathedral of the Sacred Heart of Jesus in Leshan (Diocese of Jiading), for political reasons. The Catholics were called to "listen to the word of the Party, feel the grace of the Party, and follow the Party". According to a Catholic source contacted by AsiaNews, "in China it is no longer a question of listening to the Lord, of feeling his grace and following him. This is the root of the disease of the Chinese Church today, it is difficult to get away from the influence of ideology. Politics has entered the Church", and persecution of Church members who do not want to submit to religious bodies controlled by the Party continues.

Dioceses 

The Apostolic Vicariate of Szechwan was established in 1696 with its seat in Chengtu. In 1856, the Apostolic Vicariate of Szechwan was renamed the Apostolic Vicariate of Northwestern Szechwan (also known as Apostolic Vicariate of Western Szechwan) upon the establishment of the Apostolic Vicariate of Southeastern Szechwan, with the seat of the latter in Chungking.

In 1860, the Apostolic Vicariate of Southern Szechwan was established with its seat in Suifu. In 1910, the Apostolic Vicariate of Kienchang was established with its seat in Ningyüanfu. In 1924, the Apostolic Vicariate of Northwestern Szechwan was renamed the Apostolic Vicariate of Chengtu, which was eventually promoted to Diocese of Chengtu in 1946.

Today, the Catholic Church in Sichuan has 1 archdiocese and 7 dioceses covering the entire province and the city of Chungking.

 Roman Catholic Archdiocese of Chongqing (Chungking /): Established on 2 April 1856 as Apostolic Vicariate of Southeastern Szechwan, renamed on 24 January 1860 as Apostolic Vicariate of Eastern Szechwan, renamed on 3 December 1924 as Apostolic Vicariate of Chungking, promoted on 11 April 1946 as Metropolitan Archdiocese of Chungking. Its diocesan seat is the Cathedral of St. Joseph, Chongqing.
 Roman Catholic Diocese of Chengdu (Chengtu /): Established on 15 October 1696 as Apostolic Vicariate of Szechwan, renamed on 2 April 1856 as Apostolic Vicariate of Northwestern Szechwan (also, Apostolic Vicariate of Western Szechwan), renamed on 3 December 1924 as Apostolic Vicariate of Chengtu, promoted on 11 April 1946 as Diocese of Chengtu. Its diocesan seat is the Cathedral of the Immaculate Conception, Chengdu.
 Roman Catholic Diocese of Jiading (Kiating): Established on 10 July 1929 as Apostolic Prefecture of Yachow (today known as Ya'an), promoted on 3 March 1933 as Apostolic Vicariate of Yachow, renamed on 9 February 1938 as Apostolic Vicariate of Kiating, promoted on 11 April 1946 as Diocese of Kiating (today known as Leshan). Its diocesan seat is the Cathedral of the Sacred Heart of Jesus, Leshan.
 Roman Catholic Diocese of Kangding (Kangting / Tatsienlu /): Established on 27 March 1846 as Apostolic Vicariate of Lhassa (Lhasa), renamed on 28 July 1868 as Apostolic Vicariate of Thibet (Tibet), renamed on 3 December 1924 as Apostolic Vicariate of Tatsienlu (today known as Kangding), promoted on 11 April 1946 as Diocese of Kangting. Its diocesan seat is the Cathedral of the Sacred Heart of Jesus, Kangding.
 Roman Catholic Diocese of Ningyuan (Ningyüanfu /): Established on 12 August 1910 as Apostolic Vicariate of Kienchang (today known as Xichang), renamed on 3 December 1924 as Apostolic Vicariate of Ningyüanfu, promoted on 11 April 1946 as Diocese of Ningyüan. Its diocesan seat is the Cathedral of the Angels, Xichang.
 Roman Catholic Diocese of Shunqing (Shunking /  /): Established on 2 August 1929 as Apostolic Vicariate of Shunking (today known as Nanchong), promoted on 11 April 1946 as Diocese of Shunking. Its diocesan seat is the Cathedral of the Sacred Heart of Jesus, Nanchong.
 Roman Catholic Diocese of Suifu ( /  /): Established on 24 January 1860 as Apostolic Vicariate of Southern Szechwan, renamed on 3 December 1924 as Apostolic Vicariate of Suifu (today known as Yibin), promoted on 11 April 1946 as Diocese of Suifu. Its diocesan seat is the Cathedral of the Blessed Sacrament, Yibin.
 Roman Catholic Diocese of Wanxian (Wanhsien /): Established on 2 August 1929 as Apostolic Vicariate of Wanhsien (today known as Wanzhou), promoted on 11 April 1946 as Diocese of Wanhsien. Its diocesan seat is the Cathedral of the Immaculate Conception, Wanzhou.

See also 

 Christianity in Sichuan
 Protestantism in Sichuan
 Anglicanism in Sichuan
 Methodism in Sichuan
 Quakerism in Sichuan
 Baptist Christianity in Sichuan
 Seventh-day Adventist Church in Sichuan
 Christianity in Tibet
 Anglican Diocese of Szechwan
 Anti-Christian Movement (China)
 Chinese Rites controversy
 Youyang anti-missionary riot
 Lucy Yi Zhenmei – 19th-century virgin martyr from Mianyang, canonized saint on 1 October 2000
 Catholic Church in Shaanxi – neighbouring province
 :Category:Roman Catholic churches in Chongqing
 :Category:Roman Catholic churches in Sichuan
 :Category:Roman Catholic churches in Tibet
 :Category:Roman Catholic missionaries in Sichuan
 :Category:Roman Catholic missionaries in Tibet

Notes

References

Bibliography

External links 
 

 
Sichuan
History of Christianity in Sichuan
Catholic Church in Tibet